Dicky is a Indonesian surname name and also given name or a nickname, often of Richard, sometimes of William.

Given name
Note: It is assumed that Dicky is the first name of those in this section, as their articles do not state otherwise.

 Dicky Cheung (born 1965), Hong Kong television actor and singer
 Dicky Firasat (born 1981), Indonesian footballer
 Dicky Gonzalez (born 1978), Puerto Rican baseball pitcher
 Dicky Moore (born 1978), English songwriter
 Dicky Palyama (born 1978), badminton player
 Dicky Rutnagur (born 1931), semi-retired Indian sports journalist
 Dicky Thompson (born 1957), American professional golfer

Nickname

Richard
 Dicky Barrett (born 1964), American rock singer
 Dicky Barrett (trader) (1807–1847), one of the first white traders to be based in New Zealand
 Richard "Dicky" J. Bolles (1843–1917), American salesman, one of the first to sell land in Florida, sight unseen, to non-residents
 Dicky Bond (1883–1955), English footballer
 Dicky Dorsett (1919–1999), English footballer
 Dicky Eklund (born 1958), American retired welterweight boxer
 Dicky Merritt (1897–1978), English footballer
 Dicky Moegle (1934–2021), American National Football League player
 Dicky Owen (1876–1932), Welsh rugby union player
 Dicky Pride (born 1969), American professional golfer
 Dicky Robinson (1927–2009), English footballer
 Richard "Dicky" Suett (1755–1805), English comedian and stage actor, King George III's favourite Shakespearean clown

William
 Dicky Richards (1862–1903), South African cricketer
 Dicky Wells (1907–1985), American jazz trombonist

Other
 Lawrence Adamson (1860–1932), Australian schoolmaster
 Dicky Case (1910–1980), Australian international speedway rider
 Dicky Ralph (1908–1989), Welsh rugby union and rugby league player
 Lil Dicky (born 1988), rapper

See also
 Dickey (name)
 Dickie (name)

Lists of people by nickname
English masculine given names